The 1999 Chinese Jia-A League season is the sixth season of professional association football and the 38th top-tier overall league season in China. It was named the Pepsi Chinese Jia-A League for sponsorship reasons, while the league started on March 21 and ended on December 5, 1999 and saw Shandong Luneng win the championship.

Promotion and relegation
Teams promoted from 1998 Chinese Jia-B League
Tianjin Teda F.C. 
Liaoning Tianrun (Renamed Liaoning Fushun)

Teams relegated from 1998 Chinese Jia-A League
August 1st
Guangzhou Apollo

League standings

Awards
Player of the year (Golden Ball Award)
Qu Shengqing (Liaoning Fushun)

Top scorer (Golden Boot Award)
Su Maozhen (Shandong Luneng)

Manager of the year
Slobodan Santrac (Shandong Luneng)

Best Referee
Zhang Baohua (Tianjin)

Youth player of the year
Zhang Xiaorui (Tianjin Teda F.C.)

Fair play team
Shenzhen Pingan

CFA Team of the Year

Goalkeeper: Gao Jianbin (Sichuan Quanxing)

Defence: Cheng Gang (Qingdao Hainiu), Li Weifeng (Shenzhen Pingan), Zhang Enhua (Dalian Wanda), Xie Feng (Shenzhen Pingan)

Midfield: Zhang Xiaorui (Tianjin Teda F.C.), Li Tie (Liaoning Fushun), Ma Mingyu (Sichuan Quanxing), Li Xiaopeng (Shandong Luneng)

Attack: Su Maozhen (Shandong Luneng), Qu Shengqing (Liaoning Fushun),

Remarks
Newcomer Liaoning Fushun was in the race of title into the final round. Shenyang survived demotion miraculously amid heavy match fixing accusations. Later police investigation shows the game results in the final round were arranged.

See also
Chinese Jia-A League
Chinese Super League
Chinese Football Association Jia League
Chinese Football Association Yi League
Chinese FA Cup
Chinese Football Association
Football in China
List of football records in China
Chinese clubs in the AFC Champions League

References
China - List of final tables (RSSSF)

Chinese Jia-A League seasons
1
China
China
1999 establishments in China